Seo Ho-Jin (born June 11, 1983) is a former South Korean short track speed skater who won gold in the 5000m relay at the 2006 Winter Olympics in Turin. He allegedly assaulted compatriot Viktor An during the 2005 Winter Universides, causing him to be banished from the national team. However, this was reinstated.

References

External links
 Seo Ho-Jin at the ISU
 Seo Ho-Jin at olympics.com

1983 births
Living people
South Korean male short track speed skaters
Olympic short track speed skaters of South Korea
Olympic gold medalists for South Korea
Olympic medalists in short track speed skating
Short track speed skaters at the 2006 Winter Olympics
Medalists at the 2006 Winter Olympics
Universiade medalists in short track speed skating
World Short Track Speed Skating Championships medalists
Universiade silver medalists for South Korea
Competitors at the 2005 Winter Universiade
South Korean Buddhists
21st-century South Korean people